Dennis Shaver is the current track and field coach at Louisiana State University. Shaver came to LSU in 1995 as an assistant coach. Since his arrival, he has coached 22 Olympians, 6 Olympic medalists, 411 All-Americans, 39 individual National Champions, 49 NCAA event titles and 19 national championship relay teams.

He began his college coaching career at Hutchinson Community College in Hutchinson, Kansas, in 1981 as an assistant football and track coach. In 1982, he became the head coach for the track team at Hutchinson Community College. He left Hutchinson in 1985 to become the head track coach at Barton Community College, where he had tremendous success. During his last year there, he became the first coach to ever win the NJCAA "triple crown" winning the cross-country, indoor, and outdoor titles. After Barton, Shaver became an assistant at Auburn University for the next three years before arriving in Baton Rouge in 1995 as an assistant coach. In 2004, he replaced Pat Henry as head track and field coach.

Yearly results

† - National Coach of the Year honorsX - Vacated National Championship

Personal life
He graduated from the University of Texas at Arlington in 1979 with a bachelor's degree in physical education. He later earned a master's degree in education administration from Stephen F. Austin State University in 1981.

See also
LSU Tigers track and field
LSU Lady Tigers track and field
LSU Tigers cross country
LSU Lady Tigers cross country

References

External links
 LSU Tigers bio

College track and field coaches in the United States
LSU Tigers and Lady Tigers track and field coaches
LSU Tigers and Lady Tigers cross country coaches
Auburn Tigers track and field coaches
University of Texas at Arlington alumni
Stephen F. Austin State University alumni
Sportspeople from Salina, Kansas
Living people
Hutchinson Blue Dragons football players
Hutchinson Blue Dragons football coaches
Year of birth missing (living people)